Snipe eels are a family, Nemichthyidae, of eels that consists of nine species in three genera. Depending on the species, adults may reach  in length, yet they weigh only . They are distinguished by their very slender jaws that separate toward the tips as the upper jaw curves upward. The jaws appear similar to the beak of the bird called the snipe. Snipe eels are oviparous, and the juveniles, called Leptocephali (meaning small head), do not resemble the adults but have oval, leaf-shaped and transparent bodies. Different species of snipe eel have different shapes, sizes and colors. The similarly named bobtail snipe eel is actually in a different family and represented by two species, the black Cyema atrum and the bright red Neocyema erythrosoma.

Genera and species
There are nine species in three genera:

Characteristics

Snipe eels have the long, slender body typical of eels. They are distinguished by their very slender jaws that separate toward the tips as the upper jaw curves upward and which appear similar to the beak of the bird called the snipe. The vent may be near the throat (as in N. scolopaceus) or further back on the body (as in A. gilli and A. infans). Depending on the species, adults may reach 30-60 inches long, and weigh only a few ounces to a pound. The dorsal fins show wide variation, too. For example,  A. gilli has fewer than 280 rays in its dorsal fin, while A. infans has more than 320.

The only food items actually found in the stomachs of snipe eels have been shrimp-like crustaceans, though ichthyologists believe they should be capable of catching and eating small fish and cephalopods also. Since predatory fish often feed on eel larvae, it is presumed by scientists and ichthyologists that they feed on snipe eel larvae as well. It is also thought that larger fish eat adult snipe eels though there is not much direct evidence for this.

Distribution

Snipe eels are found in every ocean and generally occupy depths of 300–600 m, though specimens have been caught nearer the surface at night, and storms occasionally result in individuals being stranded on the shore.  Larval snipe eels occupy more shallow regions of 60–70 m before descending to metamorphose into adult form.

Reproduction
Based on studies of several species of snipe eel in the Sargasso Sea and off the coast of California, it seems that snipe eels spawn mainly in the spring, but also into early summer. The juvenile forms of eels are generally called leptocephali (meaning “small head”) and do not look like their adult forms. They are flat and transparent, taking forms that may be elongated or closer to the shape of a leaf. They remain in the larval form and near the surface (upper 200 m) for several months before descending to metamorphose. This is similar to other eel species but much longer than most other fish.

Similar fish
The bobtail snipe eels are two species of deep-sea fishes in the family Cyematidae, one only in each of two genera. They are found in all oceans. Cyema atrum is black, while Neocyema erythrosoma is bright red.

Sawtooth eels are a family, Serrivomeridae, of eels found in temperate and tropical seas worldwide. Sawtooth eels get their name from the saw-like arrangement of inward-slanting teeth attached to the vomer bone in the roof of the mouth. They are deep water pelagic fish. There are eleven species of sawtooth eels in two genera:

References

Fish of the Atlantic Ocean
Fish of the Pacific Ocean
Fish of the Indian Ocean